Dibaj Rural District is a rural district (dehestan) in Lotfabad District, Dargaz County, Razavi Khorasan Province, Iran. At the 2006 census, its population was 3,297, in 913 families.  The rural district has 11 villages.

References 

Rural Districts of Razavi Khorasan Province
Dargaz County